Pterygopalatine is used to refer to structures of the pterygoid processes of the sphenoid and the palatine bone. Specifically, it can refer to:
 Pterygopalatine fossa
 Palatovaginal canal (Greater palatine canal or Pterygopalatine canal)
 Pterygopalatine ganglion (also known as the Sphenopalatine ganglion)